The Hyundai i10 is a city car produced by the South Korean manufacturer Hyundai since 2007. It replaced the Hyundai Atos in the model line-up, and was initially available only as a five-door hatchback body style. The third generation i10 was unveiled in India on 7 August 2019 and launched on 20 August 2019, offered in 10 variants across petrol and diesel engines as well as manual and automatic transmissions. There is also a sedan derivative, the Hyundai Xcent and the Hyundai Aura.



First generation (PA; 2007) 

The first generation i10 was announced on 31 October 2007 in New Delhi, India. It was produced in India at Hyundai's Chennai plant for the domestic and export markets.

In India, it has five different versions: D-Lite, Era, Magna, Sportz and Asta with a 1.1L iDREZ engine and 1.2L Kappa engine.

In Europe, it has four different versions: Classic, Style, Comfort and Eco Blue Version, with a 1.0 liter engine. All versions come with four airbags, ABS, front electric windows, air conditioning and an RDS radio/CD player. Higher versions have heated front seats, electric sunroof, start-stop system, and, optional, there is ESP.

Background
Hyundai started development of the i10 to replace the Hyundai Atos. The development for the concept was codenamed Hyundai PA. The car was targeted primarily at the Indian market and intended for production in India, given the popularity of hatchback subcompacts in the country.

Styling

The i10 has a large air dam, pulled-back headlamps, chrome lined grille, fog lamps, and a rear window with an up swept kink.

The tailgate has a chrome lined boot release handle, and a roof spoiler on the top end versions.

Overall length (3,565 mm) and wheelbase (2,380 mm) are identical to the Atos with slightly more interior space; Ergonomic design was intended to accommodate tall drivers and increasing rear knee room.

Interior
The interior has a plastic dash housing with an optional integrated stereo. The instrument binnacle has a large white faced speedometer, flanked by the tachometer and fuel and temperature gauges.

The gear shifter is built into the center console, leaving space between the front seats for two cup holders.

Facelift

In September 2010, Hyundai introduced a facelift for the i10.

Exterior
Hyundai introduced a new front end design inspired by the 'Fluidic Sculpture' design language with new, less angled headlights.

The rear tail lamps and bumper were redesigned with new reflectors.

Interior
The i10 has a two tone beige and light brown color in certain markets. The interior features chrome and silver accents and a new instrument cluster with a gear shift indicator display (on manual models) and a digital fuel indicator.

Engines

i10 iRDE 1.1
The i10 was launched with a 1.1 liter  I4 iRDE engine, the same motor used in the Kia Picanto and Hyundai Atos Prime/Santro Xing but with lower CO2 emissions.

i10 Kappa 1.2
The i10 also came with a 1.2 liter gasoline Euro 5 compliant engine (called the Kappa engine), with the same CO2 emissions as the 1.1L version. The spark plug of the 1.2L is non-standard.

i10 Diesel
A 1.1 liter three cylinder diesel CRDi variant was available in Europe and Indian Market.

i10 Electric

Hyundai unveiled the i10 concept Electric at the  Delhi Auto Expo in 2009; it was expected to be available in India by 2011. The i10 based electric car is called BlueOn.

i10 Kappa-2 1.2
In 2010 Hyundai launched a facelifted version of the i10 in India which uses a Kappa II engine with VTVT Variable valve timing.

Reception
The i10 was recognized as "Car of the Year 2008" by various automotive magazines and television channels in India, like BS Motoring, CNBC-TV18 AutoCar, NDTV Profit Car & Bike India and Overdrive magazine. The car was conferred with the Indian Car of the Year (ICOTY) by automotive media of the country.

In Malaysia, the Hyundai i10 has also earned recognition through awards such as the Best People's Car in the Asian Auto – VCA Auto Industry Awards 2009, 1st Place in Asian Auto-Mudah.my Fuel Efficiency Awards 2009 in the Compact City Cars Category with a combined fuel efficiency of 5.0l/100 km, which is not only the best performance in its category but also throughout all the participating vehicles in Malaysia.

The Hyundai i10 also won the New Straits Times / Maybank Car of the Year Award in the Entry Level Car category two times consecutively in 2009 and 2010.

In 2008, Hyundai commemorated 10 years of operations in India by initiating a transcontinental drive from Delhi to Paris in two of its i10 Kappa cars.

In 2009, the i10 became a popular buy in the United Kingdom during the Government Scrappage Scheme.

In 2013, automotive portal CarDekho awarded Hyundai i10 as 'Most Popular Hatchback' in India.

Safety
Euro NCAP test results for a LHD, five door hatchback variant on a registration of 2008:

ASEAN NCAP test results for a RHD, 5-door hatchback variant on a 2011 registration:

The amount of safety features varies from market to market. While most countries have the i10 equipped with airbags for all passengers, the entry level 1.1 manual transmission model in the Philippines can be sold without airbags. Since launch and as of August 2009, electronic stability control (ESC) was an order option for United Kingdom spec cars which prevents a five star Euro NCAP score.

India
After the success of Hyundai Santro, Hyundai launched the i10 in 2007. The i10 slotted between Santro and Getz (later replaced by i20).

In India, the first generation i10 was available in nine variants, and with two different engine options which is a 1.1L gasoline engine with manual transmission gearbox.

Second generation (IA/BA; 2013) 

Originally planned for release in the beginning of 2014, the development of the new i10 started in India in 2012, using the Kia Picanto as a test mule for individual parts.

In August 2013, the i10s redesign was revealed by Hyundai's European design team led by Thomas Bürkle. The new car was  longer,  wider and  lower than the previous model. The new dimensions result in a trunk space increase by 10%, totaling to 252 liters. Most versions can seat five occupants.

The new car made its debut at the Frankfurt Motor Show in September 2013. The i10 arrived in European showrooms in January 2014.

Production of the i10 commenced at Hyundai Assan Otomotiv's plant in İzmit, Turkey, in the end of September 2013, at an annual capacity of 200,000 units.

In addition to the previous generation, its equipment includes, depending on the version, automatic air conditioning, daytime running lights, curtain airbags, Tyre pressure monitoring system, hill-start-assist, and as options - cruise control, rear parking sensors, heated steering wheel and front seats or 15-inch alloy wheels.

Facelift

Grand i10 (BA) 
Hyundai Motor India released the model in September 2013 as the Grand i10. The Grand i10 offers dual toned interiors, enlarged cabin space, keyless entry, push button on/off and auto folding outside mirrors that automatically open and fold when car is unlocked and locked. In addition, the car is equipped with rear AC vents and 1GB internal memory to store music, which are both first in its segment.

In February 2014, Hyundai Asia Resources, Inc. (HARI) announced details on the Philippine market version of the Grand i10. The base models come with the 1.0-liter three cylinder gasoline engine while the 1.2-liter four cylinder engine is reserved for the range topping L automatic transmission model.

In the beginning of 2014, Hyundai released the Grand i10 in Mexico. The car is offered with only the 1.2-liter four cylinder engine in the market.

In Colombia a taxi model is sold under the name Hyundai Gran Metro Taxi Hatchback.

In 2019, Hyundai launched in South Africa a 2-seat commercial vehicle, the Hyundai Grand i10 Cargo.

Grand i10X
Introduced in 2015 and sold exclusively in Indonesia, the Grand i10X is a crossover-inspired variant of the Grand i10, featuring different front and rear bumpers and black plastic panels for the fender flares, door panels, rocker panels, and two-tone 14-inch alloy wheels.

Xcent/Grand i10 sedan

Prior to the official unveiling of the Grand i10, Hyundai Motor India revealed that a sedan variant will be launched in 2014. The new sedan, called the Xcent, was revealed in February 2014. It is exported to numerous emerging countries as the Grand i10 sedan.

Reception
The European i10 was met with very positive reviews. John McIlroy of What Car? magazine gave the car a five-star rating, commenting that it "represents a major step forward over its predecessor – to the point where it's an extremely tempting alternative to a VW Up, and not just on price." Piers Ward of Top Gear gave the i10 a score of 8 out of 10, with his verdict being: "Yet another quality car from the Koreans. Cheap price, good design and with minimal compromise."

Matt Burt of Autocar gave it four and a half out of five stars, calling it "one of the most accomplished and well-rounded offerings in the city car segment, and has road manners that would embarrass a few much larger (and more expensive) vehicles."

Andrew English of The Daily Telegraph also gave the car four out of five stars, describing it as "Clever and quite a nice little car. Reasonable comfort, ride, handling and well put together, though not the most economical. It's certainly the best car Hyundai makes and wouldn't be disgraced as the family's main transport."

In India, the Grand i10 was awarded the 2014 Golden Steering Wheel in the hatchback category. It was also awarded "Car of the Year" and "Entry Hatchback of the Year" at the 2014 NDTV Car and Bike Awards. In the Philippines, the Grand i10 was awarded Best Mini Car of the Year by the Car Awards Group for 2014–2015.

Powertrain

Safety
Global NCAP awarded the Indian version with no airbags and no ABS 0 stars in 2014 (similar to Latin NCAP 2013).

Latin NCAP awarded the Indian-made i10 in its most basic Latin American configuration with no airbags and no ABS 0 stars in 2015.

Euro NCAP 2014 test results (similar to Latin NCAP 2020) for a LHD, five door hatchback European variant on a registration of 2014:

Electronic Stability Control (ESC) is standard on all European models.

Third generation (AC3/AI3; 2019) 

The third-generation model debuted in India as the Grand i10 Nios on 7 August 2019.

The European i10 (codename: AC3) was revealed a month after the Indian model, just ahead of the Frankfurt Motor Show in September 2019. This model has been designed, developed and built in Europe. It is powered by a 1.0-litre T-GDi petrol engine, in addition to the 1.2-litre MPi. Both the engines get Idle Stop and Go (ISG) as standard, which helps improve fuel economy and reduce  emissions. The i10 N Line was also unveiled with a sportier exterior design.

The Euro-spec i10 production started at Hyundai Assan Otomotiv in January 2020.

Facelift
A facelift was unveiled on February 27, 2023.

Grand i10 (AI3)

India

The third-generation i10, marketed as the Grand i10 Nios was launched on 20 August 2019 in India and offered in 10 variants across petrol and diesel engines as well as manual and automatic transmissions. As it is the case with the second-generation model, it is also larger than the European model. It is available with an eight-inch infotainment system, keyless entry with engine start/stop, 5.3-inch MID, and Arkamys sound system.

The Grand i10 Nios is available with a 1.2-litre naturally aspirated four-cylinder petrol engine and a 1.2-litre turbocharged three-cylinder diesel engine. Both the engines come with a common 5-speed manual and 5-speed automated manual transmission choices.

The facelift was launched on 20 January 2023, it features a redesigned front fascia and new tail lights.

Vietnam 
The AI3 Grand i10 was introduced in Vietnam in August 2021 in both hatchback and sedan models.

Mexico 
The Grand i10 was launched in Mexico on 16 July 2020 in hatchback and sedan models. Imported from India, it is offered in four trim levels: GL, GL Mid, GLS, and NS (hatchback only) and offered in automatic and manual transmissions. It is only available with a 1.2 litre engine.

South Africa

Hyundai's new-generation Grand i10 hatchback has been launched in South Africa during October 2020. The Grand i10 Cargo has been renewed a few months later.

Aura/Grand i10 sedan

The four-door sedan version was launched as the Hyundai Aura on 21 January 2020 for the Indian market. It is called the Grand i10 Sedan for export markets.

Powertrain

Safety

India
The Indian-spec Grand i10 Nios (AI3) received a two star adult and child occupant rating from the Global NCAP in 2020. The car's structure and footwell area were deemed to be incapable of further loading. It is not equipped with three-point seat belts and head restraints for all passengers. It does not offer ESC or side airbags on any variant, but ISOFIX is offered on higher variants.

Euro NCAP 
In contrast to the disastrous rating of the Indian version, the European Hyundai i10 in its standard European configuration scored 3 stars under the much more stringent Euro NCAP 2020 protocol. Notable differences are the presence of more airbags, ESC and a strengthened structure. However, protection to vulnerable road users was rated at only 52% and the Safety Assistance systems scored 59%. Though AEB, Lane Keep Assist and steering-based driver monitoring are present, Euro NCAP states "The system performed marginally in tests of its detection and reaction to other vehicles".

Sales

References

External links

 

2010s cars
Cars introduced in 2007
Cars of India
Cars of Turkey
City cars
ASEAN NCAP superminis
Euro NCAP superminis
Global NCAP superminis
Latin NCAP superminis
Front-wheel-drive vehicles
Hatchbacks
I10
I10
Subcompact cars